Morroni is a surname. Notable people with this surname include:

  (born 1979), Italian actor
 John Morroni (1955–2018), American politician and businessman
 Perle Morroni (born 1997), French football player

See also 
 Morrone (disambiguation)